Plant propagation is the process by which new plants grow from a variety of sources: seeds, cuttings, and other plant parts. Plant propagation can also refer to the man-made or natural dispersal of seeds.

Propagation typically occurs as a step in the overall cycle of plant growth. For seeds, it happens after ripening and dispersal; for vegetative parts, it happens after detachment or pruning; for asexually-reproducing plants, such as strawberry, it happens as the new plant develops from existing parts. Plant propagation can be divided into four basic types: sexual, asexual (vegetative), layering, and grafting.

Countless plants are propagated each day in horticulture and agriculture. The materials commonly used for plant propagation are seeds and cuttings.

Sexual propagation

Seeds and spores can be used for reproduction (e.g. sowing). Seeds are typically produced from sexual reproduction within a species because genetic recombination has occurred. A plant grown from seeds may have different characteristics from its parents. Some species produce seeds that require special conditions to germinate, such as cold treatment. The seeds of many Australian plants and plants from southern Africa and the American west require smoke or fire to germinate. Some plant species, including many trees, do not produce seeds until they reach maturity, which may take many years. Seeds can be difficult to acquire and some plants do not produce seed at all. Some plants (like certain plants modified using genetic use restriction technology) may produce seed, but not a fertile seed. In certain cases, this is done to prevent the accidental spreading of these plants, for example by birds and other animals.

Asexual propagation

Plants have a number of mechanisms for asexual or vegetative reproduction. Some of these have been taken advantage of by horticulturists and to multiply or clone plants rapidly. Humans may utilize these processes as propagation methods, such as tissue culture and grafting. Plants are produced using material from a single parent and as such, there is no exchange of genetic material, therefore vegetative propagation methods almost always produce plants that are identical to the parent. Vegetative reproduction uses plant parts such as roots, stems, and leaves.

In some plants, seeds can be produced without fertilization and the seeds contain only the genetic material of the parent plant. Therefore, propagation via asexual seeds or apomixis is asexual reproduction but not vegetative propagation.

Techniques for vegetative propagation include:
Air or ground layering
Division
Grafting and bud grafting, widely used in fruit tree propagation
Micropropagation
Stolons or runners
Storage organs such as bulbs, corms, tubers, and rhizomes
Striking or cuttings
Twin-scaling
 Offsets

Heated propagator

A heated propagator is a horticultural device to maintain a warm and damp environment for seeds and cuttings to grow in.

This can be in the form of a clear enclosed bin sitting over a hot pad, or even a portable heater pointed at the bin.  The key is to keep the moisture in the clear bin, while keeping lighting over the top of it, usually.

Seed propagation mat

An electric seed-propagation mat is a heated rubber mat covered by a metal cage that is used in gardening. The mats are made so that planters containing seedlings can be placed on top of the metal cage without the risk of starting a fire. In extreme cold, gardeners place a loose plastic cover over the planters/mats which creates a sort of miniature greenhouse. The constant and predictable heat allows people to garden in the winter months when the weather is generally too cold for seedlings to survive naturally. When combined with a lighting system, many plants can be grown indoors using these mats.

See also

 Adventitious
 Clonal colony
 Fruit tree propagation
 Orthodox seed
 Recalcitrant seed
 Selection methods in plant breeding based on mode of reproduction
 Propagation of grapevines
 Weeping willow (tree) is an ornamental tree (Salix babylonica and related hybrids
 Propagation of Christmas trees
 Hemerochory
 Escaped plant

References

External links
 Reference Guide to plant care handling and merchandising

Bibliography
 Charles W. Heuser. The Complete Book of Plant Propagation, Taunton Press, 1997. 

Propagation
Horticultural techniques
Agronomy
Forest management